The Mato Grosso do Sul State University (UEMS) is a public university in the state of Mato Grosso do Sul, Brazil. It has 15 campuses all over the state, and its rectory is located in the city of Dourados.

See also 
 Federal University of Mato Grosso do Sul (UFMS)
 Federal University of Grande Dourados (UFGD)

Universities and colleges in Mato Grosso do Sul
State universities in Brazil